Zagrade Point (‘Nos Zagrade’ \'nos za-'gra-de\) is the point on the east side of the entrance to Suregetes Cove on the north coast of Krogh Island in Biscoe Islands, Antarctica.

The point is named after the historical settlement of Zagrade in Southwestern Bulgaria.

Location
British mapping in 1976.

Maps
 British Antarctic Territory.  Scale 1:200000 topographic map.  DOS 610 Series, Sheet W 66 66.  Directorate of Overseas Surveys, UK, 1976.
 Antarctic Digital Database (ADD). Scale 1:250000 topographic map of Antarctica. Scientific Committee on Antarctic Research (SCAR). Since 1993, regularly upgraded and updated.

References
 Bulgarian Antarctic Gazetteer. Antarctic Place-names Commission. (details in Bulgarian, basic data in English)
 Zagrade Point. SCAR Composite Antarctic Gazetteer.

External links
 Zagrade Point. Copernix satellite image

Headlands of the Biscoe Islands
Bulgaria and the Antarctic